Drillia oliverai is a species of sea snail, a marine gastropod mollusc in the family Drilliidae.

Description
The length of the shell of this marine species varies between 25 mm and 38 mm.

Distribution
This species occurs off Cebu Island, the Philippines.

References

 Kilburn R.N. & Stahlschmidt P. (2012) Description of two new species of Drillia from the Indo-Pacific (Gastropoda: Conoidea: Drilliidae). Archiv für Molluskenkunde 141(1): 51-55 page(s): 52

External links
 

oliverai
Gastropods described in 2012